The 1873 Waikouaiti by-election was a by-election held on 23 July 1873 in the  electorate during the 5th New Zealand Parliament.

The by-election was caused by the resignation of the incumbent MP David Monro.

Candidates for the by-election were John Lillie Gillies, Thomas Slater Pratt, and John Graham. Pratt had been mayor of Waikouaiti since July 1870. Gillies was Speaker of the Provincial Council at the time.

The by-election was won by Gillies.

Results
The following table gives the election result:

References

Waikouaiti 1873
1873 elections in New Zealand
Politics of Otago
July 1873 events
Waikouaiti